Vedran Runje (born 10 February 1976) is a Croatian retired footballer who played as a goalkeeper. A product of Hajduk Split academy, Runje spent the majority of his career abroad with Standard Liège in Belgium, Marseille and Lens in France and Beşiktaş in Turkey. With Standard, he won three Belgian League Goalkeeper of the Year awards.

Runje was also capped 22 times for Croatia national team and was part of the tournament squad at the UEFA Euro 2008.

Club career 
Runje began his professional career at Hajduk Split in 1996, but was unable to become a regular at the firstly team with first Tonči Gabrić, the Croatian national team's back-up goalkeeper at the time, and eventually young prospect Stipe Pletikosa being selected ahead of him. He eventually left the club in 1998 and joined Belgian side Standard Liège.

Runje played for Standard Liège until 2001, being named Belgian Goalkeeper of the Year in 1999 and 2001. He went on to join French club Olympique Marseille, where he was the first-choice goalkeeper over the following two and a half seasons. He helped Marseille qualify for the UEFA Champions League in 2003 and appeared in five of the club's six matches in the group stage of the competition in 2003–04. He was the club's first-choice goalkeeper until December 2003, losing his place following the arrival of Fabien Barthez in January 2004 and making no further appearances in the Ligue 1 and European competition until the end of the season.

Runje returned to Standard Liège in the summer of 2004, signing an initial three year deal. During his second spell with Standard, he won another Belgian Goalkeeper of the Year award in 2006. During the summer of the same year, he moved to Turkish side Beşiktaş. He was the first-choice goalkeeper at Beşiktaş during the 2006–07 season, making 32 Süper Lig appearances and also appearing in all of the club's six UEFA Cup matches during the season.

In the summer of 2007, Runje left Beşiktaş and returned to the French Ligue 1 after being signed by RC Lens. He appeared in all of the club's 38 matches in the Ligue 1 during the 2007–08 season, but was unable to prevent them from being relegated to the Ligue 2 after finishing 18th in the top flight. He also appeared in all of the club's six European matches during the season.

Despite rumours that he might be leaving the club following their relegation from the top flight, Runje decided to stay at Lens and eventually helped the club return to the Ligue 1 after only one season in the second division. Runje made 31 appearances in the Ligue 2 during the 2008–09 season as Lens finished top of the league. He kept his place as a regular for the club in the Ligue 1 and went on to make 32 league appearances during the 2009–10 season, only missing the final six league matches of the season due to an injury. Runje and Lens mutually parted ways on 2011, after the two sides agreed to terminate his contract.

International career
Between 1993 and 1996, Runje won a total of 8 international caps for the Croatian national under-19 and under-21 teams. He also made one appearance for Croatia B in a friendly match against Romania in January 2001.

When Slaven Bilić was appointed Croatia's head coach in the summer of 2006, Runje started to play understudy to Stipe Pletikosa in the national team. He made his full international debut on 15 November 2006 in Croatia's UEFA Euro 2008 qualifier at Israel, which they won 4–3. His second appearance in the UEFA Euro 2008 qualifiers came in Croatia's 6–0 win at Andorra in September 2007, and he also made further two international appearances in Croatia's friendly matches against Bosnia and Herzegovina and Slovakia during the same year.

Runje was also a member of the Croatian 23-man squad at the UEFA Euro 2008 finals in Austria and Switzerland, making his only appearance in Croatia's final group game against Poland in Klagenfurt. He kept a clean sheet in a 1–0 victory for Croatia, who played the game with a second string of players, having already secured a place in the quarter-finals after beating Austria and Germany in their previous two matches at the tournament. His only other international appearance during the year 2008 came in a friendly match at Slovenia in August, where he replaced Pletikosa at half-time.

In June 2009, Runje was promoted first-choice goalkeeper at the Croatian national team after Pletikosa lost his place as a regular at his club, Spartak Moscow. His first appearance in the 2010 FIFA World Cup qualifiers was in Croatia's 2–2 draw at home to Ukraine on 6 June 2009. On 5 September 2009, he produced several good saves to help Croatia secure a 1–0 win at home to Belarus in the World Cup qualifiers, being seen by many as the Man of the Match. He also made several good saves in Croatia's next qualifier at England four days later, but was eventually unable to save the team from suffering a crushing 5–1 defeat. He was also responsible for England's fifth goal, failing to make a clearance after a back pass and enabling Wayne Rooney to score easily with an unguarded goal in front of him. Runje made a total of five appearances during the 2010 FIFA World Cup qualifying campaign, which saw Croatia failing to qualify for the finals after finishing third in their group. Runje's last official appearance for Croatia came in June 2011 against Georgia, where he helped Croatia win 2-1 for a Euro 2012 qualifying match.

Personal life 
Runje is married to his first love Tihana and they have a son Roko. Runje's younger brother Zlatko Runje was also a professional goalkeeper who last played for NK Hrvace.

Honours (as player)
Beşiktaş
 Turkish Cup: 2006–07
 Turkish Super Cup: 2006

Lens
 Ligue 2: 2008–09
 UEFA Intertoto Cup: 2007

Individual
 Belgian Goalkeeper of the Year: 1998–99, 2000–01, 2005–06
 Olympique de Marseille Player of the Season: 2001–02
 Ligue 2 Goalkeeper of the Year: 2008–09
 Ligue 2 UNFP Team of the Year: 2008–09

Honours (as goalkeeper coach)
Royal Antwerp F.C.
Belgian Cup: 2019–20
Porto
Primeira Liga: 2021–22
Taça de Portugal: 2021–22
Taça da Liga: 2022–23
Supertaça Cândido de Oliveira: 2022

References

External links
 

1976 births
Living people
People from Sinj
Association football goalkeepers
Croatian footballers
Croatia youth international footballers
Croatia international footballers
UEFA Euro 2008 players
HNK Hajduk Split players
Standard Liège players
Olympique de Marseille players
Beşiktaş J.K. footballers
RC Lens players
Croatian Football League players
Belgian Pro League players
Ligue 1 players
Süper Lig players
Ligue 2 players
Croatian expatriate footballers
Expatriate footballers in Belgium
Expatriate footballers in France
Expatriate footballers in Turkey
Croatian expatriate sportspeople in Belgium
Croatian expatriate sportspeople in France
Croatian expatriate sportspeople in Turkey
Association football goalkeeping coaches
Royal Antwerp F.C. non-playing staff
FC Porto non-playing staff
Croatian expatriate sportspeople in Portugal